Rogas is a genus of braconid wasps in the family Braconidae. There are at least 100 described species in Rogas.

See also
 List of Rogas species

References

Further reading

External links

 

Parasitic wasps